This is a timeline of the Ilkhanate.

13th century

1210s

1220s

1230s

1240s

1250s

1260s

1270s

1280s

1290s

14th century

1300s

1310s

1320s

1330s

1340s

1350s

See also
Timeline of the Yuan dynasty
Timeline of the Chagatai Khanate
Timeline of the Golden Horde
Timeline of the Mongol Empire
Timeline of Mongols prior to the Mongol Empire

References

Bibliography
 .

 (alk. paper) 
 

 

  (paperback).
 

 
 .

 

 
 

 

 

 

 
  
 

 
 

Ilkhanate
Ilkhanate